Club Deportivo Curibamba is a Peruvian football club, playing in the city of Andahuaylas, Apurímac.

The club is the biggest of Andahuaylas city, and one of the biggest in Apurímac Province.

The club play in the Copa Perú which is the third division of the Peruvian league.

History
The club have played at the second level of Peruvian football in the 2006 Segunda División Peruana, but was relegated the same year.

In the 2007 Copa Perú, the club classified to the National Stage, but was eliminated by IDUNSA of Arequipa in the Round of 16.

Honours

Regional
Región VIII: 0
Runner-up (1): 2007

See also
List of football clubs in Peru
Peruvian football league system

Football clubs in Peru